Randell may refer to:

People
Given name
Randell (given name), masculine given name in the English language

Surname
Aleksi Randell (born 1975), Finnish politician
Arthur Randell (1901–1988), British author
Brian Randell (born 1936), British computer scientist
Choice B. Randell (1857–1945), American politician from Texas
Cortes Wesley Randell (1935–2020), American engineer
Denny Randell (born 1941), American songwriter
Ernest Randell (1873–1938), Australian cricketer
George Randell (1830–1915), Australian politician from Western Australia
Lynne Randell (1950–2007), Australian singer
Ron Randell (1918–2005), Australian-American film actor
Ronnie Randell (1886–1978), South African cricketer and lawyer
Steve Randell (born 1956), Australian Test cricket umpire; convicted of sexual assault against schoolgirls
Taine Randell (born 1974), New Zealand rugby union player
William Randell (1824–1911), Australian riverboat pioneer and politician

See also

Randel
Randle
Randal (disambiguation)
Randall (disambiguation)